Pavel Platonaw (born 7 February 1986 in Minsk) is a retired Belarusian footballer. His latest club was Torpedo-BelAZ Zhodino.

He is the twin brother of Dzmitry Platonaw.

Honours
BATE Borisov
Belarusian Premier League champion: 2006, 2007
Belarusian Cup winner: 2005–06

Gomel
Belarusian Cup winner: 2010–11

External links

1986 births
Living people
Belarusian footballers
Twin sportspeople
Belarusian twins
FC Energetik-BGU Minsk players
FC BATE Borisov players
FC Granit Mikashevichi players
FC Shakhtyor Soligorsk players
FC Gomel players
FC Gorodeya players
FC Torpedo-BelAZ Zhodino players
Association football midfielders